Zoe Hickel (born July 10, 1992) is an American ice hockey player who currently serves as assistant coach to the Ohio State Buckeyes women's ice hockey program. She most recently played with Linköping HC of the Swedish Women's Hockey League (SDHL) in the 2019–20 season. Hickel played collegiate ice hockey with the Minnesota Duluth Bulldogs program, a member of the NCAA Division I. She competed with the United States national women's ice hockey team at the 2015 IIHF Women's World Championship. In 2015 Zoe Hickel joined the Boston Pride of the National Women's Hockey League (NWHL).

Playing career
Hickel attended the North American Hockey Academy (NAHA) for the entirety of her high school career, from 2007 to 2011. In her senior season with the NAHA, she served as a captain. With the NAHA team, she won the Junior Women's Hockey League (JWHL) Championship twice, in 2008 and 2011.

Professional hockey

NWHL
Prior to the 2017 NWHL All-Star Game in Pittsburgh, Hickel was traded from the Boston Pride to the Connecticut Whale in exchange for the Whale's first round pick in the 2017 NWHL Draft. At the All-Star Game, Hickel wore the Pride logo on her Team Kessel jersey.

CWHL
Hickel was selected by Kunlun Red Star of the Canadian Women's Hockey League with their fifth round pick in the 2017 CWHL Draft. On October 21, 2017, the Red Star competed in their first game against the Markham Thunder where Hickel scored the team's first goal, as Kelli Stack and Baiwei Yu both earned the assists. During the season, Hickel returned to her home state of Alaska, as the Kunlun Red Star competed in an exhibition game in Anchorage on January 5, 2018. Hickel finished the season with the Red Star amassing 12 goals and 38 points. Her 26 assists led all skaters in the CWHL during the regular season.

On June 28, 2018, Hickel signed as a free agent with the Calgary Inferno.

Career statistics

USA Hockey

NWHL

CWHL

Awards and honors

NCAA
WCHA Offensive player of the Week Oct. 25, 2013
 WCHA Offensive player of the week Jan. 10, 2014
 WCHA All-Academic team 2013-2014

CWHL
First Star of the Game, 2019 Clarkson Cup

References

External links
 
 
 

1992 births
Living people
American women's ice hockey forwards
Boston Pride players
Connecticut Whale (PHF) players
Clarkson Cup champions
Minnesota Duluth Bulldogs women's ice hockey players
Premier Hockey Federation players
Isobel Cup champions
Shenzhen KRS Vanke Rays players
Linköping HC Dam players